Caeoma elegans is a species of rusts.

References

External links 

 Caeoma elegans at Mycobank

Pucciniales
Fungi described in 1823